Negros Oriental's 1st congressional district is one of the three congressional districts of the Philippines in the province of Negros Oriental. It has been represented in the House of Representatives of the Philippines since 1916 and earlier in the Philippine Assembly from 1907 to 1916. The district consists of the northern Negros Oriental cities of Canlaon and Guihulngan, as well as adjacent municipalities of Ayungon, Bindoy, Jimalalud, La Libertad, Manjuyod, Tayasan and Vallehermoso. It is currently represented in the 19th Congress by Jocelyn Sy-Limkaichong of the Liberal Party (LP).

Representation history

Election results

2022

2019

2016

2013

2010

See also
Legislative districts of Negros Oriental

References

Congressional districts of the Philippines
Politics of Negros Oriental
1907 establishments in the Philippines
Congressional districts of Central Visayas
Constituencies established in 1907